Ellaranthalla Nanna Ganda is a 1997 Indian Kannada film, directed by S. Umesh and produced by K. Prabhakar. The film stars Vishnuvardhan, Prema, Umashree and Tara in the lead roles. The film has musical score by Upendra Kumar.

Plot

Surya (Vishnuvardhan) is living with his mother (Umashree) in a middle class background.

Cast

Vishnuvardhan as Surya
Prema as Nethra 
Umashree
Tara
Ashalatha as Lakshmi 
Girija Lokesh as Girija
Jyothi
Meena
Doddanna 
B. C. Patil as Vishwaprasad 
Lokanath
Lohithaswa
Rajanand
Brahmavar
Kunigal Vasanth
Krishne Gowda
Suresh Sharma
Ashok Babu
Tennis Krishna
Bank Janardhan
Dingri Nagaraj as Broker Nagaraj
Rathnakar
Lakshman
Sathyajith
Bharath
M. N. Vasudeva Rao
Joe Simon
Kunigal Nagabhushan
Ramanjulu
Ramamurthy
Srishailan
Shankar Bhat
M. S. Karanth
Biradar
Master Anand
Master Vinayaka Joshi
Master Mohan
Master Rakesh

References

External links
 

1990s Kannada-language films
Films scored by Upendra Kumar